Bradly is both a given name and surname. Notable people with the name include:

Given name
Bradly van Hoeven (born 2000), Dutch footballer
Bradly Sinden (born 1998), British Taekwondo athlete

Surname
Graeme Bradly (born 1946), Australian rules footballer
Mark Bradly (born 1977), Australian rules footballer

See also
Bradley
Bradlee